Josep Feliu i Codina (also known by his Spanish name José Feliú y Codina; 11 June 1845 – 2 May 1897) was a Catalan journalist, novelist and playwright whose work is linked to the Realist movement and to the Catalan Renaixença.

Biography
Codina was born in Barcelona in May 1845. An affiliate of the Partit Liberal Dinàstic (Liberal Monarchist Party), he took a law degree in 1867 and worked in several administrative posts for the party. He also began his literary career at that time, initially writing in Catalan. In 1867, he founded the weekly periodical La Pubilla. A year earlier, he had produced his first comedy Un mosquit d'arbre (A Mosquito Tree), and in 1871 his first serious play, Els fadrins externs (The Strange Companions). He also collaborated (under the pseudonym "Josep Serra") on several plays by Frederic Soler. During his time in Barcelona he went on to write several more plays and novels, and founded two more periodicals, Lo Nunci and La Jornada.

In 1886, Feliu i Codina moved to Madrid where he became fluent in Spanish. He was the editor La Iberia and also wrote for El Rhin, La América, La Revolución, and La Democracia. Once in Madrid, much of his dramatic output was written in Spanish. Two of his most well-known plays from that time are La Dolores (1892) which formed the libretto for Tomás Bretón's 1895 opera of the same name and María del Carmen (1896) which formed the libretto for Enrique Granados's 1898 opera, María del Carmen. Both plays had several film adaptations. María del Carmen was also the basis of a Broadway musical, Spanish Love, which opened on 17 August 1920 at the Maxine Elliott Theatre in New York City and ran for 308 performances. In addition to his own plays and novels, he translated into Spanish a collection of tales by the Italian Renaissance writer, Matteo Bandello, and several short stories by the French novelist and playwright, Honoré de Balzac.

Feliu i Codina's brother, Antoni Feliu i Codina (1846–1917), was a prominent politician and man of letters. Both brothers wrote for the Catalan literary magazine, Un troç de paper. Josep Feliu i Codina died in Madrid on 2 May 1897.

References

Clark, Walter Aaron, Enrique Granados: Poet of the Piano, Oxford University Press US, 2006, p. 39. 
Enciclopèdia Catalana, SAU, "Josep Feliu i Codina" (in Catalan). Accessed 20 January 2009.
Puerto, Pedro Montón, "Feliú y Codina, José" on Calatayud.org (in Spanish). Accessed 20 January 2009.

External links
Public domain essays written by Josep Feliu i Codina (under the pseudonym "Josep Serra") for the literary magazine, Un troç de paper. All texts are in the original Catalan.
 (Satirical commentary on the opera L'Africaine)
 (Story about the life of Mr. Rafael, a very home-loving man)
 (Scenes of a neighbourhood festival celebrating a saint)
Public domain plays written by Josep Feliu i Codina. All texts are in the original Catalan.
A ca'la sonambula
Del ou al sou...

1845 births
1897 deaths
Catalan dramatists and playwrights
Spanish opera librettists
People from Barcelona
Translators from Catalonia
French–Spanish translators
Italian–Spanish translators
19th-century Spanish journalists
Male journalists
19th-century translators
19th-century Spanish dramatists and playwrights
Male dramatists and playwrights
19th-century male writers